Johannes Brotherus (born 1997 in Helsinki) is a Finnish actor and musician who is best known for starring in the 2013 Pirjo Honkasalo film Concrete Night. He started playing violin at the age of three, and in addition to his acting career, also plays in the band Brotherus Brothers with his two brothers. He is a member of the pop band Kuumaa.

Filmography

Concrete Night (2013)
Urban Family (2015)
Wildeye (2015)

Personal life
Brotherus' father is Antti Ikonen, ex-keyboard player for Stratovarius.

References

External links

1997 births
Living people
Male actors from Helsinki
Finnish male film actors
Finnish male musicians